Gorj County is a county (județ) of Romania, in Oltenia, with its capital city at Târgu Jiu. Gorj comes from the Slavic Gor(no)-Jiu (“upper Jiu”), in contrast with Dolj (“lower Jiu”).

Demographics

 Romanians – over 98%
 Roma, others –  2%

Geography

The North side of the county consists of various mountains from the Southern Carpathians group. In the West there are the Vâlcan Mountains, and in the East there are the Parâng Mountains and the Negoveanu Mountains. The two groups are split by the Jiu River.

To the South, the heights decrease through the hills to a high plain at the Western end of the Wallachian Plain.

The main river, which collects all the smaller rivers, is the Jiu River.

Neighbours

 Vâlcea County to the east.
 Mehedinți County and Caraș-Severin County to the west.
 Hunedoara County to the north.
 Dolj County to the south.

Economy
The predominant industries in the county are:
 Mining equipment industry.
 Food and beverages industry.
 Textile industry.
 Mechanical components industry.
 Glass industry.
 Wood industry.

In the North of the county coal is extracted, near Motru and Rovinari. There are two big thermo electrical power plants at Rovinari and Turceni, and some hydro-electrical power plants. The county is the biggest electricity producer in Romania, with 36% of the country's electricity.

Due to the decrease in mining activity, the county has one of the highest unemployment levels in the country.

Tourism

The main tourist destinations are:
 The city and the area around Târgu Jiu:
 The Constantin Brâncuși sculptural ensemble;
 Tismana Monastery.
 The Parâng Mountains.
 Polovragi Monastery.

Politics
The Gorj County Council, renewed at the 2020 local elections, consists of 32 counsellors, with the following party composition:

Administrative divisions 

Gorj County has 2 municipalities, 7 towns and 61 communes
Municipalities
Motru- population: 18,142 (as of 2011)
Târgu Jiu – capital city; population: 78,553 (as of 2011)

Towns
Bumbești-Jiu
Novaci
Rovinari
Târgu Cărbunești
Țicleni
Tismana
Turceni

Communes
Albeni
Alimpești
Aninoasa
Arcani
Baia de Fier
Bălănești
Bălești
Bărbătești
Bengești-Ciocadia
Berlești
Bâlteni
Bolboși
Borăscu
Brănești
Bumbești-Pițic
Bustuchin
Câlnic
Căpreni
Cătunele
Ciuperceni
Crasna
Crușeț
Dănciulești
Dănești
Drăgotești
Drăguțești
Fărcășești
Glogova
Godinești
Hurezani
Ionești
Jupânești
Lelești
Licurici
Logrești
Mătăsari
Mușetești
Negomir
Padeș
Peștișani
Plopșoru
Polovragi
Prigoria
Roșia de Amaradia
Runcu
Săcelu
Samarinești
Săulești
Schela
Scoarța
Slivilești
Stănești
Stejari
Stoina
Țânțăreni
Telești
Turburea
Turcinești
Urdari
Văgiulești
Vladimir

Historical county

Historically, the county was located in the southwestern part of Greater Romania, in the northern part of the historical region of Oltenia. Its capital was Târgu Jiu. The interwar county territory comprised a large part of the current Gorj County.

It was bordered to the west by Mehedinți County, to the north by the counties of Hunedoara and Sibiu, to the east by Vâlcea County, and to the south by Dolj County.

Administration

The county was originally divided into four administrative districts (plăși):

Plasa Gilort, headquartered at Gilort
Plasa Jiu, headquartered at Jiu
Plasa Novaci, headquartered at Novaci
Plasa Vulcana, headquartered at Vulcana

Subsequently, two more districts were established:Plasa Amaradia, headquartered at Amaradia
Plasa Ocolu, headquartered at Ocolul

Population
According to the 1930 census data, the county population was 206,339 inhabitants, ethnically divided as follows: 97.9% Romanians, 1.7% Romanies, as well as other minorities. From the religious point of view, the population was 99.6% Eastern Orthodox, as well as other minorities.

Urban population
In 1930, the county's urban population was 13,030 inhabitants, comprising 90.0% Romanians, 4.6% Romanies, 1.1% Germans, 0.9% Hungarians, 0.8% Jews, as well as other minorities. From the religious point of view, the urban population was composed of 95.8% Eastern Orthodox, 2.2% Roman Catholic, 0.8% Jewish, as well as other minorities.

Industry
In the county capital of Târgu Jiu, there was a factory producing roof tiles as of 1931.

References

External links

 
Counties of Romania
Geography of Wallachia
Place names of Slavic origin in Romania
1879 establishments in Romania
1938 disestablishments in Romania
1940 establishments in Romania
1950 disestablishments in Romania
1968 establishments in Romania
States and territories established in 1879
States and territories disestablished in 1938
States and territories established in 1940
States and territories disestablished in 1950
States and territories established in 1968